Dimitri Sturdza (born 10 November 1938), also known as Tim Sturdza, is a Swiss former professional tennis player.

Early life and ancestry 
Born in Iași, he is the son of Prince Gheorghe Sturdza (b. 1912) and his Norwegian wife, Margareta Kvaal. By birth, he is a member of the House of Sturdza, powerful Romanian aristocratic family that later settled in Lausanne, Switzerland. Paternally, he is great-great-grandson of Mihail Sturdza, the reigning Prince of Moldavia.

Biography 
During his youth, he traveled the world, using a French passport. Outside of tennis he holds a master's degree in atomic physics and was involved with the European space program.

Career 
Sturdza made the third round of the French Open once and was a Davis Cup player for Switzerland from 1964 to 1978, winning 17 rubbers. His best Davis Cup singles wins were over West Germany's Wilhelm Bungert in 1966 and France's Georges Goven in 1970. He was non playing captain of the Swiss team for the 1992 Davis Cup World Group final against the United States.

See also
List of Switzerland Davis Cup team representatives

References

External links
 
 
 

1938 births
Living people
Swiss male tennis players
Swiss tennis coaches
Romanian emigrants to Switzerland
Sturdza family
Sportspeople from Iași
Swiss people of Norwegian descent